U magnovenju (In a long intuitive flash) is the third studio album by the Serbian punk rock band Goblini, released by Metropolis Records in 1996. The album was available on compact cassette only, until it was rereleased with the debut album on the compilation album Istinite priče + Goblini in 1998. The album was re-released by One Records in 2002.

Track listing

Personnel
 Vlada Kokotović — bass, backing vocals
 Zoran Jević "Fric" — drums
 Alen Jovanović — guitar, backing vocals
 Leo Fon Punkerstain — guitar, backing vocals
 Branko Golubović "Golub" — vocals
 Aleksandar Radosavljević — producer

References

 EX YU ROCK enciklopedija 1960-2006, Janjatović Petar;

External links
 Goblini at B92.fm
 Re Contra at Discogs

1996 albums
Goblini albums